Khatib & Alami (K&A) ( Arabic : خطيب وعلمي ) is multidisciplinary urban and regional planning, architectural and engineering consulting company. It has been ranked 40 on ENR 2017 Top 225 International Design

History 
K&A was established in Feb. 1964 by founders ( Prof. Mounir Khatib and Dr. Zuheir Alami )

By 1980 K&A expanded to operate services in Saudi Arabia, U.A.E, Bahrain and Oman.

In 2017, Dr Najib Khatib was elected Chairman of the Board of Directors, Under the leadership of Dr Khatib, K&A marked several milestones in 2020, including an extension on its largest PMO project in KSA and extension of contracts with Aramco and KSA’s Ministry of Housing.

Awards 

 Al Habtoor City, UAE - "ENR Global Best Project - Residential/Hospitality" 
Khatib & Alami (K&A) was appointed "Construction and Engineering Heavyweight Consultancy of the Year" at the KSA Awards 2019 Design Week at Okku, Riyadh on 30 September 2019.

References 

Engineering consulting firms
Architecture in Lebanon
Privately held companies
Consulting firms established in 1964